Cordova Airport may refer to:

 Cordova Municipal Airport in Cordova, Alaska, United States (IATA: CKU)
 Merle K. (Mudhole) Smith Airport in Cordova, Alaska, United States (IATA: CDV)
 José María Córdova International Airport in Medellín, Colombia (IATA: MDE)

See also
Cordoba Airport